Gliese 504 b (often shortened to GJ 504 b) is considered by NASA to be a Jovian planet and it is located in the system of the solar analog 59 Virginis (GJ 504), discovered by direct imaging using HiCIAO instrument and AO188 adaptive optics system on the 8.2-meter Subaru Telescope of Mauna Kea Observatory, Hawaii by Kuzuhara et al.  Visually, GJ 504 b would have a magenta color. It can be seen from Earth in the constellation Virgo.

History of observation
The discovery images were taken in 2011 and common proper motion was confirmed in 2012 as part of the Strategic Explorations of Exoplanets and Disks with Subaru (SEEDS) survey. The SEEDS survey aims to detect and characterize giant planets and circumstellar disks using the 8.2-meter Subaru Telescope. In February 2013 Kuzuhara et al. submitted the discovery paper to The Astrophysical Journal, and in September it was published. A follow-up study published in the October 2013 edition of the Astrophysical Journal confirmed methane absorption in the infrared H band, the first time this has been done for a directly imaged planet that formed within a disk.

Properties
GJ 504 b's spectral type was originally projected to be late T or early Y, and a follow-up study estimated that a T8 spectral type was the best fit. Its effective temperature is 544±10 К (271±10 °C), much cooler than previously imaged exoplanets with a clear planetary origin. The angular separation of the planet from its parent star is about 2.5 arcseconds, corresponding to a projected separation of 43.5 AU, which is nearly nine times the distance between Jupiter and the Sun, which poses a challenge to theoretical ideas of how giant planets form. This planet is seen as an excellent target for detailed spectroscopic characterization due to its proximity to Earth and its wide separation.

Estimated mass of Gliese 504 b depends on the value of its age, which is poorly known. The discoverers adopted age value 0.16 Gyr and estimated mass as 4.0 MJup. In 2015, other astronomers obtained age value 4.5 Gyr, which corresponds to 20-30 MJup. In this case, the object is a brown dwarf rather than a planet. In 2017, an intermediate age value 2.5 Gyr was published. Even with the lowest age, it is the oldest extrasolar planet directly imaged, as for 2013.

Radius of Gliese 504 b is estimated as 0.96 ± 0.07 RJ.

Notes

References

External links
 

Exoplanets detected by direct imaging
Exoplanets discovered in 2013
Giant planets
Virgo (constellation)
5
Brown dwarfs